In Gyo-jin(born August 29, 1980) is a South Korean actor. He is best known for his supporting roles in various television dramas.

Career
In Gyo-jin was born in Jochiwon, Yeongi County, South Chungcheong Province (now Sejong City). He studied English Language and Literature at Dankook University.

In made his acting debut in 2000, first appearing in the long-running television series Lifetime in the Country. Early in his career, his then-agency proposed that he use a stage name, and he was known as Do Yi-sung until 2011. In 2012, he reverted to using his birth name under the advice of his agency Madin Entertainment. He signed with a new agency in 2015, KeyEast which also managed his wife, actress So Yi-hyun. The couple left KeyEast in 2020 along with fellow entertainers Jung Ryeo-won and Son Dam-bi and joined H& Entertainment, which was founded by KeyEast's former general manager Hong Min-ki.

Personal life
His father, In Chi-wan, is the CEO of a plastic manufacturing company. In is the eldest of two siblings and his younger brother, In Doo-jin, is also an actor.

In married actress So Yi-hyun on October 4, 2014. In and So had been friends for a decade before dating; they were costars in Fairy and Swindler (2003), Aeja's Older Sister, Minja (2008) and Happy Ending (2012). Their first child, a daughter named In Ha-eun, was born on December 4, 2015. In Gyo-jin and his daughter were cast members of the KBS2's variety show The Return of Superman. On April 23, 2017, it was reported that In Gyo-jin and So Yi-hyun were expecting their second child. In October 2017, they welcomed their second daughter.

Filmography

Films

Television series

Television show

Theater

Awards and nominations

References

External links

 
 

1980 births
Living people
Dankook University alumni
People from South Chungcheong Province
Gyodong In clan
South Korean male actors
South Korean male film actors
South Korean male television actors
21st-century South Korean male actors
South Korean television personalities